Bukowa Woda is a river of Poland and is a tributary of the Lisi Potok.

See also
List of rivers of Poland

References

Rivers of Poland